Yu-Gi-Oh! Arc-V is the fifth main anime series in the Yu-Gi-Oh! franchise and the eighth anime series overall. It is produced by Nihon Ad Systems and broadcast by TV Tokyo. It is directed by Katsumi Ono and produced by Studio Gallop. Its plot focuses on Yuya Sakaki, who is a boy seeking to become the greatest entertainer in Action Duels who brings forth a new summoning method to Duel Monsters known as Pendulum Summoning. Currently, twelve pieces of theme music are used for the series: six openings and six ending themes. From episodes 1–30, the first opening theme is "Believe × Believe" by Bullet Train, while the first ending theme is "One Step" by P-Cute. From episodes 31–49, the second opening theme is "Burn!" by Bullet Train, while the second ending theme is "Future Fighter!" by Kenshō Ono and Yoshimasa Hosoya. From episodes 125–147, the sixth opening theme is "Pendulum Beat!" by Super★Dragon, while the sixth ending theme is "Dashing Pendulum" by M!lk. For the English dub version, the opening theme is "Can You Feel the Power" for all episodes.

Series overview

Episode list

Season 1 (2014–15)

Season 2 (2015–16)

Season 3 (2016–17)

DVD releases

English

Notes

References

Arc-V
Yu-Gi-Oh! Arc-V